The 1960 United States presidential election in Texas was held on November 8, 1960, as part of the 1960 United States presidential election. The Democratic Party candidate John F. Kennedy, narrowly won the state of Texas with 50.52 percent of the vote to the Republican candidate Vice President Richard Nixon's 48.52%, a margin of two percent, giving him the state's 24 electoral votes. Despite the presence of U.S. Senator Lyndon B. Johnson on the Democratic ticket, the result made Texas the tenth closest state in the election. Nixon's strong performance in the Dallas–Fort Worth Metroplex, Harris County, the Panhandle, and the Hill Country kept the race close.

Fears of anti-Catholic voting in West Texas, which had given Herbert Hoover a narrow win over Al Smith in 1928, were not entirely realized. It is notable that the sparsely populated rural Plains counties of Armstrong, Bailey, Childress, Collingsworth, Dallam, Dawson, Donley, Floyd, Gaines, Hale, Hardeman, Hartley, Moore, Motley, Parmer, Wheeler, Willbarger and Yoakum switched from Stevenson to Nixon, as did Wise County north of Fort Worth, while a further thirty-eight counties saw Kennedy fail to reach Stevenson's vote percentage. However, this was more than offset by Kennedy's gains in heavily Hispanic Catholic South Texas, where few Mexicans had voted in 1928. Anti-Catholic voting was also lessened by appeals from former President Harry Truman, who campaigned for Kennedy and Johnson.

Nixon himself later commented "we lost Texas...because of that asshole Congressman", referring to Bruce Alger. The only Republican congressman in Texas at the time, Alger had led protestors, many of them well-heeled conservative women, against Johnson's visit to Dallas on November 4th. One woman pulled his wife's gloves out of her hand, and her hat was knocked off by a protestor's placard. Nicknamed the "mink coat mob", the resulting press coverage was a humiliation for Texas Republicans and was blamed for damaging the party's electoral results in the South generally at a time when wives were regarded as sacrosanct.

Nixon would narrowly lose Texas again in 1968, although he did win the presidency that year. In 1972, he sought re-election and won Texas with an overwhelming sixty-six percent of the popular vote.

, this is the last time Glasscock County voted for a Democratic presidential candidate.

Results

Results by county

See also
 United States presidential elections in Texas

References

1960 Texas elections
1960
Texas